The sênh tiền is a Vietnamese musical instrument. The senh tien is a combination of clapper, rasp, and jingle made from three pieces of wood and old Chinese coins. It is also played among the Muong people.

The Sistrum is a similar instrument from Ancient Egypt.

References

Vietnamese musical instruments